Pashons 2 - Coptic calendar - Pashons 4

The third day of the Coptic month of Pashons, the ninth month of the Coptic year. In common years, this day corresponds to April 28, of the Julian Calendar, and May 11, of the Gregorian Calendar. This day falls in the Coptic Season of Shemu, the season of the Harvest.

Commemorations

Apostles 

 The departure of Saint Jason, one of the Seventy Apostles

Martyrs 
The martyrdom of Saint Otimus, the Priest

Saints 
The departure of Pope Gabriel IV, 86th Patriarch of the See of Saint Mark (1094 A.M.), (1378 A.D.)

References 

Days of the  Coptic calendar